Assistant Secretary of Defense is a title used for many high-level executive positions in the Office of the Secretary of Defense within the U.S. Department of Defense. The Assistant Secretary of Defense title is junior to Under Secretary of Defense. Reorganization Plan No. 6 of 30 June 1953 increased the number of assistant secretaries. The list of Assistant Secretaries of Defense includes:

 Assistant Secretary of Defense for Public Affairs, originally established as the Assistant to the Secretary (Director, Office of Public Information) by Secretary James V. Forrestal in July 1948.
 Assistant Secretary of Defense for Health Affairs, originally established in 1949 as the Chairman, Armed Forces Medical Policy Council. The position has been abolished and restored several times.
 Assistant Secretary of Defense for Homeland Defense and Hemispheric Affairs, established in 2003
 Assistant Secretary of Defense for Global Strategic Affairs 
 Assistant Secretary of Defense for Manpower and Reserve Affairs, mandated by the Department of Defense Authorization Act of 1984 (P.L. 98-94, passed 24 September 1983).
 Assistant Secretary of Defense for Special Operations/Low Intensity Conflict & Interdependent Capabilities
 Assistant Secretary of Defense for Legislative Affairs
 Assistant Secretary of Defense for Industrial Base Policy
 Assistant Secretary of Defense for Internal Communications
 Assistant Secretary of Defense for Networks & Information Integration / Chief Information Officer
 Assistant Secretary of Defense for International Security Affairs
 Assistant Secretary of Defense for Research and Engineering / Chief Technology Officer
 Assistant Secretary of Defense for Sustainment
 Assistant Secretary of Defense for Acquisition
Assistant Secretary of Defense for Nuclear, Chemical, and Biological Defense Programs
Assistant Secretary of Defense for Indo-Pacific Security Affairs
Assistant Secretary of Defense for Strategy, Plans and Capabilities
Assistant Secretary of Defense for Readiness

The deputy to an Assistant Secretary of Defense has the title Deputy Assistant Secretary of Defense.

Assistant Secretaries in the Military Departments
There are also several assistant secretaries in each of the three Military Departments: Department of the Army, Department of the Navy, and the Department of the Air Force.

 Assistant Secretary of the Army
 Assistant Secretary of the Navy
 Assistant Secretary of the Air Force

See also
 Deputy Secretary of Defense, the number two position, next to the Secretary of Defense
 Assistant Secretary of War

References

External links
 Office of the Secretary of Defense

 
 Assistant Secretary of Defense